1989 Emmy Awards may refer to:

 41st Primetime Emmy Awards, the 1989 Emmy Awards ceremony honoring primetime programming
 16th Daytime Emmy Awards, the 1989 Emmy Awards ceremony honoring daytime programming
 17th International Emmy Awards, the 1989 Emmy Awards ceremony honoring international programming

Emmy Award ceremonies by year